Mahmoud Abdul Razak (born 27 November 1971) is a former Syrian footballer who played for Syria national football team.

External links

zerozero.pt

1971 births
Syrian footballers
Living people
Syria international footballers
Place of birth missing (living people)
Association football defenders
Syrian Premier League players